Semporna is the capital of the Semporna District in the Tawau Division of Sabah, Malaysia. Its population was estimated to be around 35,301 in 2010.

History 

Semporna was founded soon after the British North Borneo Chartered Company established Sandakan, and initially settled by Chinese traders, most fleeing from Spanish attacks on the Sulu Sultanate. Before being named "Semporna", this area was known as "Tong Talun" in Bajau language which means "Hujung Hutan" in Malay or "at the end of the forest" in English. Panglima Uddang, Panglima Sallehangni and Panglima Sakti of Bajaus Kubang ancestry were responsible for this name. Governor Treacher renamed the place "Labuan Semporna" which is Malay for "perfect anchorage" but the word Labuan was subsequently dropped. Other sources translate "Semporna" as "Peaceful Place".

Including other parts of eastern Sabah, this area was ruled by the Sultanate of Sulu before being handed over to the British North Borneo Chartered Company in 1876 by agreement. From that time on the area came under permanent British administration. Other western powers, including the Dutch, tried to conquer this area in June 1876 but were repelled by the British presence here.

This area also was long a main landing point for pirates. Very few people lived on the coasts for fear of these marauders, as they roamed the seas, kidnapping, raiding and killing. Action by Sir James Brooke, and other western colonial powers such as the Dutch and Spanish, managed to successfully combat the pirates over the course of the 1800s. Upon the advent of the Chartered Company in the early 1880s, only one pirate stronghold remained at Omadal island, which was defeated by HMS Zephyr in 1886. By mid 1887, a trading station on the southern side of the entrance to Darvel Bay was established. With pirates having recently destroyed the settlement of Maimbung in Sulu, some of the Chinese merchants there asked for permission to settle in the Company's territory, under the rule of law and its resulting security. Semporna was the site of a small-scale migration of Chavacano speakers from Zamboanga, fleeing the Malaysia-funded Moro Conflict between Muslim rebels and the Philippine government. These Chavacanos speak a Creole of Mexican-Spanish and are partially descended from Peruvian settlers mixed with indigenous Filipinos  from the former Rajahnate of Sanmalan.

Geography 

Semporna is located at the tip of Semporna Peninsula around Lahad Datu Bay (also known as Darvel Bay), and is visited by tourists as a base for scuba diving or snorkelling trips to Pulau Sipadan (Sipadan Island), some 36 kilometres southeast of town.

Climate
Semporna has a tropical rainforest climate (Af) with heavy rainfall year-round.

Demographics 

The majority of the population is Bajau, many of whom live in sprawling stilt villages over the water on the outskirts of town. Thousands of Bajau Laut (also known as Sea Gypsies or Pala'u) people live on the sea around Semporna. They are one of the few nomadic seaborne peoples of the world, and spend most of their lives on boats, making a livelihood from the coral reefs in the area. For some Bajau Laut people, the only time that their bodies spend any extended time on land is when they are buried after death.

The main ethnic minority populations in Semporna are the Kadazan and Chinese communities. The majority of Chinese people in Semporna are from the Hakka ethnic group.

Religion 
Islam is the most represented religion with 85% of the citizens being Muslim, followed by Christian with 12.45%, while Buddhists represent 1% of residents.

Languages 
Sabah Malay creole is the lingua franca in Semporna. Semporna is also home to the only Chavacano-speaking community in Malaysia. Semporna's Chavacano speakers are refugees (or descendants of refugees) who fled the Moro conflict of the Philippines. A large number of these refugees live in Malaysia illegally.

Economy 
Marine products are still the mainstay of the local economy, as well as tourism. Pearl culturing is a major component of this industry.

Tourism 

Semporna is also known for the Regatta Lepa traditional boat races which occur annually in April. Semporna was also the location of the finish line of Eco-Challenge: Borneo, held in 2000. Off the coast is a marine park called Tun Sakaran Marine Park, also known as Semporna Islands Park. It was gazetted by Sabah Parks in 2004.

Semporna is the gateway to diving in world-renowned island paradises like Sipadan, Mabul, Kapalai, Mataking, Sibuan, Mantabuan, Siamil and Pom Pom among others. Visitors to Semporna are mainly sunseekers looking for relaxation or watersports activities such as scuba diving or snorkelling.

Cuisine 
As Semporna is a coastal town, various fresh seafood are readily available, cheap, and delicious.

References

External links 

 

Semporna District
Towns in Sabah